Stebbins is a large lunar impact crater on the far side of the Moon. It is located along the north-northeastern rim of the even larger crater Birkhoff, with about one-third of Stebbins laid across the interior of Birkhoff. To the north of Stebbins is the smaller Hippocrates, and to the west is Sommerfeld.

This is a worn and eroded crater with smaller impacts along the rim edge and the interior. The most notable of these is a small crater across the northwestern rim. The interior floor is relatively flat, with a central ridge offset to the northeast of the midpoint. To the southeast of this ridge is a small craterlet, and to the southwest is a small hill and the outer rim of a partly submerged craterlet.

Satellite craters
By convention these features are identified on lunar maps by placing the letter on the side of the crater midpoint that is closest to Stebbins.

References

 
 
 
 
 
 
 
 
 
 
 
 

Impact craters on the Moon